Bangladesh women's national volleyball team is the national women's volleyball team of Bangladesh. It is governed by the Bangladesh Volleyball Federation (B.V.F.) and takes part in international volleyball competitions and friendly matches.

References

External links
FIVB profile

 

National, Women's
Bangladesh
Volleyball
Women's sport in Bangladesh